Basuo is a town on the west coast of Hainan Province, China. It is the administrative center of the county-level city of Dongfang; in other words, Basuo is Dongfang's main urban area, and Basuo's location is usually shown on less-detailed maps by a circle labeled "Dongfang".

History
Basuo's port has been the outlet for the Shilu iron-ore mine since the early 1940s, when it was first connected to Shilu by a narrow-gauge railway. The railway since been converted to the standard gauge, and is a part of the Hainan Western Ring Railway.

Basuo was one of the landing zones of communist forces during the Landing Operation on Hainan Island at the end of the Chinese Civil War in 1950.

Basuo Port

A fishing and commercial port, Basuo operates under the UN/LOCODE CNBAS.

References

Populated places in Hainan
County seats in Hainan